In chess composition, a motif is basic element of a move in the consideration why the piece moves and how it supports the fulfillment of a stipulation. Any move may and often does contain multiple motifs. Some composition schools put specific emphasis on motivation in chess problems, especially strategical school and Slovak school.

A composition where a maximum number of a certain motif occurrences is shown is called a task, even if  the term task is more general.

Classification of motifs

Motifs may be classified according to various viewpoints. In the usual twomovers they might be:

 Positive - those working towards the accomplishment of the stipulation
 Attacking - positive motifs of white moves
 Weakening - negative motifs of white moves
 Negative - those tending to hinder the accomplishment of the stipulation
 Defensive - negative motifs of black moves
 Harmful - positive motifs of black moves

Similar classification is valid for all directmates, selfmates, reflexmates and other problems with antagonistic aims of sides, while for helpmates and other help-problems only positive/negative level is applicable.

Contents of motifs

The basic orthodox motifs are:

 Preventing the move of other unit (includes taking of a flight of the king)
 Allowing the move of other unit (includes creating of a flight of the king)
 Guarding of some square or line
 Unguarding of some square or line
 Attacking of king (checking)

In fairy chess some other motifs are possible.

Forms of motifs

Any of the above-listed motifs may be presented in various forms. In orthodox chess problems these forms include:

 Capture (prevents move of captured unit, allows move of king to square previously guarded by captured piece)
 Line opening (allows move of pieces along opened line, guards square on the opened line, checks by opening the line)
 Line closing (prevents move of pieces along closed line, unguards square on the closed line, removes checks by closing the line)
 Blocking (prevents move of the king or any other piece to the blocked square)
 Unblocking (allows move of the king or any other piece to the unblocked square)
 Pinning (prevents move of pinned piece, unguards square previously guarded by pinned piece)
 Unpinning (allows move by the unpinned piece, guards square by unpinned piece)
 Exchange sacrifice

In the fairy chess, other forms of motifs are possible, e.g., allowing the move by a grasshopper by providing the hurdle or allowing the capture by a piece by patrolling in Patrol chess.

While studies also may contain problem motifs, they often contain usual tactical motifs.

Chess problems